Victoria Valentinovna Podgorna (born February 10, 1969, Snizhne, Donetsk Oblast, Ukrainian SSR) is a Ukrainian entrepreneur and politician. In the Verkhovna Rada of the 6th convocation, she was an assistant to the pro-Russian political and statesman Natalia Korolevska. She has been engaged in expert, advisory and scientific activities. She is a People's Deputy of Ukraine of the 9th convocation.

Biography 
She graduated from the Faculty of Political Science of Kharkiv State University (specialty "History, Political Science"). She studied in graduate school at the Department of Philosophy of Kharkiv State University. Candidate of Philosophical Sciences in Social Philosophy.

She was the head of the project "Management Consulting Groups" and worked as a chief consultant of the National Institute for Strategic Studies.

She is the chairman of the Board, founder and executive director of the NGO "Public Council of Smart City". She lives in Kyiv.

In the Verkhovna Rada of the 6th convocation she was an assistant to the pro-Russian political and stateswoman Natalia Korolevska.

Podgornaya is a member of the Coordination Council for the Development of the Digital Economy and Society. Expert of the NGO "High-tech Office Ukraine".

She was a candidate for People's Deputies from the "Servant of the People" party in the 2019 parliamentary elections, № 128 on the list.

Member of the Verkhovna Rada Committee on Digital Transformation. Co-chair of the group for interparliamentary relations with the Kingdom of Denmark.

References 

Ukrainian women in business
1969 births
Living people
People from Snizhne
National University of Kharkiv alumni
Ninth convocation members of the Verkhovna Rada
Servant of the People (political party) politicians
21st-century Ukrainian women politicians
Women members of the Verkhovna Rada